La Pobla de Lillet is a municipality in the comarca of the Berguedà in Catalonia. It is located in the upper valley of the Llobregat river and is linked to Guardiola de Berguedà by Road B-402.

The town is home to the Artigas Gardens, a park designed by Antoni Gaudí in the 1900s. Other sights include the 15th-century bridge, the Sanctuary of Falgars and remains of the late 13th-century fortress.

Transportation

The  is a 600 mm gauge tourist railway that runs from the narrow gauge railway museum at La Pobla de Lillet to the cement museum at Clot del Moro.

History

 Castell de Lillet is a ruined castle. The remains are located on a large rock, near the torrent of Junyent to the left of the Arija.Built in the 9th century and re-enforced in the 14th century the castle remained active till the 15th century.
On September 8, 1864 La Pobla de Lillet suffered a major flood that took away a mill and two houses and in which a four-year-old boy died.

Festivals
 Easter Monday - Falgars Dance and Cinquagesma Festival
 1st Sunday of October- Festa Major del Roser

References

 Panareda Clopés, Josep Maria; Rios Calvet, Jaume; Rabella Vives, Josep Maria (1989). Guia de Catalunya, Barcelona: Caixa de Catalunya.  .  .

External links
Official website 
 Government data pages 

Municipalities in Berguedà